Maureen Barry O'Delany (1 December 1888 – 27 March 1961), professionally known as  Maureen Delany and also billed as Maureen Delaney, was an Irish stage actress and screen actress of British films

Life and career 
She was born in Kilkenny, Ireland, daughter of Barry Delany, who died when she was three months old. She was educated in Galway and originally intended to train for the opera, as she had a fine singing voice. However, she was accepted into the Abbey School of Acting by Lennox Robinson. She made her debut on the stage in Edward McNulty's comedy The Lord Mayor in 1914.

She quickly gained a reputation as a noted comic actress and singer. She became identified with Maisie Madigan in Juno and the Paycock and Bessie Burgess in The Plough and the Stars (both by Seán O'Casey), as well as the Widow Quin in Synge's Playboy of the Western World. In 1959 she was nominated for a Tony Award for her part in the play God and Kate Murphy.

She also appeared in a number of plays by Irish playwright Teresa Deevy which were staged at the Abbey Theatre, A Disciple in 1931, Temporal Powers in 1932, Katie Roche in 1937, which toured to the Ambassador Theatre, New York, USA, this play also toured to the Arts Theatre, Cambridge, England also in 1937, Temporal Powers in 1937, In Search of Valour in 1947.

Filmography

Playography 
 A Disciple (1931)
 Temporal Powers (1932)
 Katie Roche (1937)
 Temporal Powers (1937)
 In Search of Valour (1947)

References

External links
 

Maureen Delany at the Teresa Deevy Archive
Maureen Delany at the Abbey Theatre Archive

Abbey Theatre
Irish stage actresses
Irish film actresses
People from Kilkenny (city)
1888 births
1961 deaths
20th-century Irish actresses
Irish emigrants to the United Kingdom